is a Japanese professional baseball catcher.  He has played in Nippon Professional Baseball (NPB) for the Fukuoka SoftBank Hawks and Tohoku Rakuten Golden Eagles and Chunichi Dragons.

Career

Fukuoka SoftBank Hawks
Fukuoka SoftBank Hawks selected Yamashita with the first selection in the 2010 NPB draft.

On May 6, 2013, Yamashita made his NPB debut.

Tohoku Rakuten Golden Eagles
On November 14, 2017, Hawks traded Yamashita to the Tohoku Rakuten Golden Eagles for Tetsuro Nishida.

On December 2, 2020, he become a free agent.

Chunichi Dragons
On December 12, 2020, Yamashita signed with Chunichi Dragons of NPB. December 18, 2020, Yamashita held press conference.

References

External links

 NPB.com

1992 births
Living people
Baseball people from Sapporo
Chunichi Dragons players
Nippon Professional Baseball catchers
Fukuoka SoftBank Hawks players
Tohoku Rakuten Golden Eagles players
Brisbane Bandits players
Japanese expatriate baseball players in Australia